Vatica elliptica is a rare species of tree in the family Dipterocarpaceae, native to Mindanao island in the Philippines.

Distribution
The tropical rain forest tree is endemic to Mount Kaladis in Zamboanga del Sur province, on the Zamboanga Peninsula of Mindanao island, in the southern Philippines. It is part of the Mindanao montane rain forests ecoregion flora.

It is an IUCN Red List Critically endangered species. Threatened by habitat loss, it is considered to be very close to extinction.

See also
 List of threatened species of the Philippines

References

External links
 

elliptica
Endemic flora of the Philippines
Flora of Mindanao
Trees of the Philippines
Zamboanga del Sur
Critically endangered flora of Asia
Taxonomy articles created by Polbot